Space Force is a BBC Radio science fiction serial, broadcast from 4 April 1984 to 17 June 1985.

Written by Charles Chilton, it was originally intended to be a sequel to his Journey into Space series (broadcast in the 1950s), using the cast which had just made a one-off revival of that series ("The Return From Mars"); while this idea was dropped late in the development of the serial, the four characters are nevertheless essentially the same as those from the earlier series, albeit with different names.

The first series begins during the northern summer of 2010. Both series seem to initially mirror the first two Journey Into Space stories before branching off into quite different plots.

A second series, known as Space Force 2, featured the same main characters, once again played by Barry Foster, Nigel Stock, Nicky Henson, and Tony Osoba.

Within both series, Space Force is the name of the team's spaceship, rather than the name of an organisation.

Each episode had an approximate run-time of 30 minutes.

First series
The episodes of the first series, broadcast in 1984, were:

 "The Voice from Nowhere" (4 April 1984)
 "Towards the Unknown" (11 April 1984)
 "The Silver Strangers" (18 April 1984)
 "The Time Ship" (25 April 1984)
 "Threshold of the Stars" (2 May 1984)
 "Marooned in Space" (9 May 1984)

Second series
The episodes of the second series, broadcast in 1985, were:

 "The Return of the Sun God" (13 May 1985)
 "The Red Planet" (20 May 1985)
 "The Great Martian Pyramid" (27 May 1985)
 "A Test of Endurance" (3 June 1985)
 "Living with Death" (10 June 1985)
 "Unto Death and Beyond" (17 June 1985)

Characters
The main characters in Space Force were:

Music
Both the first and second series reused commercially available incidental music by Jerry Goldsmith.  Cues from Logan's Run, Outland, Twilight Zone the Movie and Capricorn One can be heard in series one, while music from The Wind and the Lion, Star Trek: The Motion Picture, Poltergeist, Gremlins , Coma, and Alien can be heard in series two.

BBC Radio 2 programmes
British science fiction radio programmes
Fiction set in 2010
Fiction set on Mars
Works about astronauts
1984 radio programme debuts
1985 radio programme endings